William Watkins was an English professional association footballer who played as an inside forward. He played 42 games and scored seven goals in the Football League for Burnley between 1898 and 1902.

References

English footballers
Association football forwards
Burnley F.C. players
Trawden Forest F.C. players
English Football League players
Trawden F.C. players
Year of death missing
Year of birth missing